Nikolay Braichenko (born in Shchuchinsk on ) is a Kazakh biathlete.

Braichenko competed in the 2010 Winter Olympics for Kazakhstan. He finished 84th in the Biathlon sprint.

As of February 2013, his only result at the Biathlon World Championships is a 22nd place finish, as part of the 2011 Kazakh men's relay team.

As of February 2013, his best Biathlon World Cup finish is 14th, as part of the Kazakh men's relay team at Antholz in 2010/11. His best individual finish is 45th, in the individual at Pokljuka in 2010/11.

References 

1986 births
Biathletes at the 2010 Winter Olympics
Kazakhstani male biathletes
Living people
Olympic biathletes of Kazakhstan
Asian Games medalists in biathlon
Biathletes at the 2011 Asian Winter Games
Asian Games gold medalists for Kazakhstan
Medalists at the 2011 Asian Winter Games
21st-century Kazakhstani people